The Sawtooth Bridges are a pair of railroad bridges on the Northeast Corridor (NEC) known individually as Amtrak Bridge No. 7.80 and Amtrak Bridge No. 7.96. They are located in the Meadowlands in Kearny, New Jersey between Newark Penn Station and Secaucus Junction at a stretch where the rights-of-way of Amtrak, NJ Transit, PATH, and Conrail converge and re-align. The name refers to their appearance and the numbers refer to the milepoint (MP) from New York Penn Station. Originally built by the Pennsylvania Railroad, they are now owned and operated by Amtrak. They are slated for replacement as part of the Gateway Program, an infrastructure-improvement program along the NEC.

History

The viaducts were built in 1907 by the Pennsylvania Railroad as part of its New York Tunnel Extension project, which included the Portal Bridge and the North River Tunnels. The bridges are east of the former Manhattan Transfer station.

Junctions and interlockings
At this stretch of the Northeast Corridor, the rights-of-way of Amtrak, NJ Transit, PATH, and Conrail converge, run parallel, and re-align. Amtrak Bridge No. 7.80 carries two NEC tracks over four NJ Transit commuter rail tracks used by the Montclair-Boonton Line, the Morristown Line and the Gladstone Branch. Amtrak Bridge No. 7.96 carries the two NEC tracks over one track of PATH's Newark–World Trade Center line and the single track Conrail (CRCX) Center Street Branch freight rail line. There is no junction with PATH.

East of the bridges at "Swift Interlocking" (MP 7.2) it is possible for NJ Transit Midtown Direct trains on the Morris and Essex Lines and Montclair-Boonton Line to enter (via Track 5) and leave the Northeast Corridor. "Hudson Interlocking" (MP8.3) and the single track limited-use NJ Transit "Red Bridge", part of the Waterfront Connection, allows trains access to the NEC when travelling to or from Newark Penn in the west. It is generally used by NJ Transit's North Jersey Coast Line or Raritan Valley Line trains access to Hoboken Terminal on the Hudson Waterfront.

Replacement and expansion to four tracks
The Sawtooth Bridges, considered a part of major bottleneck in the busiest section of the Northeast Corridor, are slated for replacement as part of the Gateway Program, an infrastructure improvement program along 10 miles of the rail line between Newark and New York. The plans call for expansion of the right-of-way to four tracks and would also include the construction of new bridges in the Kearny Meadows over Newark Turnpike and Belleville Turnpike. Initial stages of replacement of the nearby Portal Bridge over the Hackensack River began in 2019.

In March 2020, the Federal Railroad Administration (FRA) issued an environmental assessment. Construction would involve the building of a new bridge (Sawtooth Bridge North), where service would be transferred during the demolition of existing Sawtooth Bridge south and building of its replacement. The project will also build new viaduct for NJ Transit Track 5. As of 2020, the projected year for completion was 2029.

See also
 Kearny Junction
 Bergen Tunnels
 List of bridges, tunnels, and cuts in Hudson County, New Jersey
 List of Northeast Corridor infrastructure
 List of New Jersey railroad junctions

References

External links 
Gateway Program
Amtrak Gateway Program
Northeast Corridor Investment Plan 2017

Amtrak bridges
Bridges completed in 1907
NJ Transit bridges
Pennsylvania Railroad bridges
Railroad bridges in New Jersey
Bridges in Hudson County, New Jersey
Kearny, New Jersey
Northeast Corridor